Melodorum siamensis (Taxonomic synonym Rauwenhoffia siamensis; locally called nom-maew) is a plant in the family Annonaceae. Melodorum siamensis is a small tree, related to the ylang-ylang. It  requires little care and can even be kept in containers, blooming from spring until fall. Despite their plainness, the flowers of the Melodorum have a smell that can travel very far. It is for this that Asian gardeners include it among their favorite garden plants. This plant can tolerate some shade; however, lack of sunlight adversely affects flowering.

Description 
The Melodorum siamensis is a native tree of Thailand, a perennial plant with a small trunk, and a height of 1–2 meters, darkly-coloured stalks and drooping branches.  Their leaves are especially monocotyledonous, long, and sharp.  A single one can bloom as group of 1–3 flowers, which are yellow-green in color, 1–2 cm large, very fragrant, and have 6 petals.  The flowers bloom throughout the year.

Region found 
Nom-maew are the endemic plants found only in the rain forests of central and southern Thailand, but are also popular house plants.  The nom-maew is sometimes called the 'tree of Thailand'.

Cultivation 
This tree is a good container plant. It is relatively problem-free and requires little care. Even though the flowers are inconspicuous, a single flower has a quite strong and pleasant aroma, thus the plant has a high value and is often used in Asian gardens.

Properties 
It is an essential ingredient in a famous Indonesian herbal concoction which includes, besides Melodorum, ginseng root, powdered corn, etc.  It has a pleasant taste and aroma, and can offer a variety of benefits including: improving muscle tone, expands circulation, reduces blood pressure, restores a regular heart rhythm, increases red blood cell count, reduces pain and fatigue, cleanses the body of toxic substances and stimulates intellectual activity.

Literature 
Nom-maew can be found in Thai literature due to the fact that it is so common. For instance, the Thai poem Journey to Muang Klang (Sunthorn Pho, 1806) contains a reference to the tree.

References 

 Alex Butova. (ม.ป.ป.). Fragrant Plants of Annonaceae Family. เข้าถึงได้จาก Top Tropicals: http://toptropicals.com/html/toptropicals/articles/trees/annonaceae_fragrant.htm
 Muangsatun. (4 October 2013). Stock Photo - Nom-Meaw, Flower. เข้าถึงได้จาก www.canstockphoto.com: http://www.canstockphoto.com/nom-maew-flower-16131968.html
 นันทวัน บุณยะประภัศร, อรนุช โชคชัยเจริญพร, และ มหาวิทยาลัยมหิดล คณะเภสัชศาสตร์. (2541). สมุนไพรไม้พิ้นบ้าน เล่ม2. กรุงเทพ: กรุงเทพฯ : คณะเภสัชศาสตร์ มหาวิทยาลัยมหิดล.

Annonaceae
Taxa named by Nguyên Tiên Bân